Events in the year 1958 in Bulgaria.

Incumbents 

 General Secretaries of the Bulgarian Communist Party: Todor Zhivkov
 Chairmen of the Council of Ministers: Anton Yugov

Events 

 The First English Language School was founded in Sofia.

Sports 

 November 7 – The 1958 Bulgarian Cup Final (the 18th final of the Bulgarian Cup) was contested between Spartak Plovdiv and Minyor Pernik at the Vasil Levski National Stadium in Sofia. Spartak won the final 1–0.
 June 20 – 22 – The 1958 Wrestling World Cup was held in Sofia.

References 

 
1950s in Bulgaria
Years of the 20th century in Bulgaria
Bulgaria
Bulgaria